Chun In-shik (born March 5, 1968) is a South Korean sprint canoer who competed in the late 1980s. At the 1988 Summer Olympics in Seoul, he was eliminated in the semifinals of the K-1 500 m event and the repechages of the K-4 1000 m event.

References
 

1968 births
Canoeists at the 1988 Summer Olympics
Living people
Olympic canoeists of South Korea
South Korean male canoeists
Asian Games medalists in canoeing
Canoeists at the 1990 Asian Games
Asian Games gold medalists for South Korea
Medalists at the 1990 Asian Games